Local Government New Zealand Te Kahui Kaunihera ō Aotearoa (LGNZ) is the local government association of New Zealand. It represents the interests of the regional, city, and district councils in New Zealand.

History 
The Association was formed in 1988 when, confronted with pending local government reform, the Municipal Association and the Counties Association agreed to merge into a single local government association.  Two years later, in 1990, the New Zealand Regional Government Association (representing the nation's regional councils) agreed to join.  In 1996 the amalgamated association adopted the brand name Local Government New Zealand.

About 
Local Government New Zealand carries out a range of functions. It advocates for local democracy and promotes best practice in governance and delivery of local government services. Local government in New Zealand own 90% of the road network, most of the country's water and waste water networks, as well as recreation and community facilities such as parks, sportsgrounds and libraries. Local Government New Zealand also carries out policy work and interacts with areas such as the Resource Management Act. It conducts its policy work through a number of established committees; an economic development committee; a community issues committee; an environmental committee and an infrastructure and transport committee.

Local Government New Zealand is an incorporated society.  Membership is voluntary and open to all territorial local authorities (cities and districts) and regional councils. 77 of 78 local authorities are currently members after Timaru District Council left the body in September 2021.  Policy and strategic direction is set by the National Council, a body elected by local authorities through a series of electoral colleges to ensure it is representative of the different types of councils as well as having representation from both North and South Islands.  There are six geographical zones, which elect representatives to the National Council and meet regularly, as well as four sector groups, metropolitan, provincial, rural and regional, which also elect members to the National Council and meet regularly to discuss and provide feedback on policy issues.

The National Council consists of 15 mayors, senior councillors and regional council chairs, including a directly elected president. Members serve a term of three years and elections are held immediately after the triennial local authority elections. There is a Māori Advisory Committee, Te Maruata (consisting of Māori elected members) and the Community Board Executive Committee (representing community boards, sub-municipal elected bodies found in just over half the cities and districts). The National Council employs a chief executive who operates a secretariat which advises the National Council; prepares submissions on relevant legislation and regulations;  promotes good practice; leads strategic communication and provides a professional development program for elected members. Funding is primarily drawn from annual subscriptions.

Local Government New Zealand has a single office located in the capital, Wellington.  Since the beginning of 2010, regular Central Government Local Government Forums have been held.  These meetings are between the National Council of Local Government New Zealand and relevant members of Cabinet. Scheduled for a half day once a year, they are jointly chaired by the Prime Minister and the president of Local Government New Zealand.  Agendas deal with current issues of joint concern and future directions.

In its policy work the key messages promoted by Local Government New Zealand are:
Local autonomy: councils should have sufficient autonomy to respond to community needs and preferences.
Local difference: One size does not fit all. New Zealand is a diverse country with differing local and regional needs, priorities and values, consequently as many decisions as efficiently possible should be made at the sub-national level.
Local regulations: more recognition needs to be given by governments to the cumulative impacts of regulation, especially the fiscal cost of implementation on councils and their citizens. This can be achieved by involving local government more directly when regulations are in the development phase.
Local funding: the current range of funding options for local government is too restricted and councils need additional funding tools.
Local infrastructure: local government's role as the provider of local and regional infrastructure needs to be given greater recognition and acknowledgement when national infrastructural planning is undertaken.
Local democracy: local government provides citizens and groups of citizens with choices over the ways their different needs are met and is accountable to these citizens through open and transparent processes.
Local partnerships: local government has the potential to break down government silos and facilitate a more seamless, place based and whole of government response to pressing local and regional issues.

LGNZ Excellence Awards 
LGNZ Excellence Awards are annual awards starting from 2014 that to recognise local government projects within communities. In 2014 LGNZ President Lawrence Yule said, “These awards give national recognition to the strong impact projects driven by local authorities can have through community, infrastructure and economic development.” 

There are four categories: Environmental Well-being, Economic Well-being, Social Well-being and Cultural Well-being with local authorities submitting award applications. In 2021, the awards were judged by Dame Kerry Prendergast, diplomat Sir Maarten Wevers, and think tank director Dr. Oliver Hartwich.

See also
 Local Government Commission
 Territorial authorities of New Zealand

References

External links
 Local Government New Zealand

Local government in New Zealand
Government of New Zealand
1988 establishments in New Zealand
Government agencies established in 1988
Local government organizations